Chal Revegeh (also Romanized as Chāl Revegeh; also known as Chāleh Revgar and Chāleh-ye Revgar) is a village in Darreh Kayad Rural District, Sardasht District, Dezful County, Khuzestan Province, Iran. At the 2006 census, its population was 57, living in 10 families.

References 

Populated places in Dezful County